The following are the winners of the 27th annual (2000) Origins Award, presented at Origins 2001:

External links
 2000 Origins Awards Winners

2000 awards
2000 awards in the United States
Origins Award winners